Geosign, based out of Guelph, Ontario was an Internet media company focused on online publishing and targeted search.

History 
Geosign owned over 180 websites in 20 different categories. Geosign claimed to receive over 35 million unique visitors to its collection of sites every month.  Some of Geosign’s notable sites included GizmoCafe.com, ThinkFashion.com, TheRenewablePlanet.com.  Tim Nye was Geosign’s Chairman and founder.

In March 2007, American Capital Strategies invested $160 million in Geosign.

In November 2007, the company's assets were reportedly divided between Moxy Media, a wholly owned subsidiary of American Capital Strategies, and eMedia Interactive Inc., controlled by Tim Nye.

See also
Online publishing

References

External links
The Globe and Mail, March 09, 2007 – Ontario Net firm gets $160-million backing
The Toronto Star,  Mar 08, 2007  – Guelph Web publisher Geosign snags $160 million financing
 Guelph Daily Mercury, Jan 16, 2008, page A.12. by Vik Kirsch. – Geosign movement raises speculation about split. 
https://web.archive.org/web/20080412062858/http://www.financialpost.com/magazine/story.html?id=324817
[Coverage in TheStreet.com]

2001 establishments in Canada
Defunct technology companies of Canada
Online publishing companies of Canada
Companies based in Guelph